Corenne Bruhns (born January 31, 1991 in Naperville, Illinois) is a Mexican ice dancer. With partner Ryan Van Natten, she is the 2012 Mexican national champion.

Programs

With Van Natten

With Westenberger

With Lavrik

Singles career

Competitive highlights

With Van Natten

With Westenberger

With Lavrik

Singles career

References

External links 

 
 
 
 

Mexican ice dancers
1991 births
Living people
Sportspeople from Naperville, Illinois
21st-century Mexican dancers